Sweihan, also spelled Swaihan or Suwayḩān, is a town in the region of Al-Ain,  northwest of the city of Al Ain in the Emirate of Abu Dhabi, the United Arab Emirates. It is noted for its surrounding farms.

The village is the site of the National Avian Research Centre (aka NARC). It breeds the iconic Houbara bustard. The town of Swaihan was founded by the late Saif Al-Mashgouni. The Noor Abu Dhabi solar farm, the world's largest single plant with 3.2 million solar panels, is located near the town.

See also
 Al Faqa

References

Eastern Region, Abu Dhabi
Populated places in the Emirate of Abu Dhabi